The electric vehicle industry in China is the largest in the world, accounting for around 57.4% of global production of electric vehicles (EVs) and around 500,000 exports in 2021. In 2021, CAAM reported China had sold 3.34 million passenger electric vehicles, consisting 2.73 million BEVs (battery-only EVs) and 0.6 million PHEV (plug-in hybrid electric vehicles), which is around 53% share of the global market of 6.23 million "new energy" passenger vehicles – BEVs, PHEVs, and HEVs.  and recording new sales of 186,000 commercial EVs in 2021.

Plug-in electric vehicle (BEV and PHEV) sales was 15% of the overall automotive sales in China in 2021. NEV adoption rapidly increased to a record 28% in March 2022, and according to BYD chairman Wang Chuanfu could reach 35% by end of 2022, exceeding the government goal of 20% by 2025. The plug-in market in China was dominated by Chinese companies, with BYD Auto and SAIC Motor occupying the top two spots, and 5 out of the top 7 spots.

The battery industry is closely related to the EV industry as batteries constitute around 1/3 of the cost of EVs and around 80% of lithium-ion batteries in the world are used in EVs. The industry also has significant Chinese presence, with major players including world's largest CATL, BYD, CALB, Gotion, SVOLT and WeLion.

History

Electric vehicle manufacturers

Plug-in electric vehicle (BEV and PHEV) sales was 15% of the overall automotive sales in China in 2021. NEV adoption rapidly increased to a record 28% in March 2022, and according to BYD chairman Wang Chuanfu could reach 35% by end of 2022, exceeding the government goal of 20% by 2025. The plug-in market in China was dominated by Chinese companies, with BYD Auto and SAIC Motor occupying the top two spots, and 5 out of the top 7 spots.

It is difficult to estimate the comparative size of EV companies in China as foreign companies such as Tesla and VW have significant sales and manufacturing in China, while Chinese companies such as BYD have significant overseas sales. Some Chinese companies also have foreign-based subsidiaries such as Geely, which owns Polestar and Lynk & Co.

Foreign companies
Tesla opened its first "Gigafactory" outside the United States in Shanghai, China, in 2019. Giga Shanghai was the first automobile factory in China fully owned by a foreign company, and was built in less than 6 months, becoming Tesla's main export hub. In November 2021, total production was 56,965 vehicles and capacity was estimated to be nearing 700,000 vehicles per year, becoming the largest of the Tesla factories. There is an expansion planned to increase capacity to up to 1.1 million in 2022, and possibly 2 million in the future, becoming the company's largest plant by far.

Volkswagen manufactures electric vehicles in China through joint ventures such as Volkswagen Anhui (formerly JAC-VW), SAIC-VW (Anting), FAW-VW (Foshan), producing vehicles based on the Volkswagen MEB platform. Capacity is expected to reach a total of 1 million by 2023, around 20% of Volkswagen's total automotive production in China.

Domestic companies

BYD Auto

BYD Auto Co., Ltd. is the automotive subsidiary of the Chinese multinational BYD Co Ltd, headquartered in Xi'an, Shaanxi Province. It was founded in January 2003, following BYD Company's acquisition of Qinchuan Automobile Company in 2002. The company produces cars, buses, trucks, electric bicycles, forklifts and rechargeable batteries. The current model range of automobiles includes electric vehicles, plug-in hybrid vehicles and petrol engine vehicles.

It is the fourth largest plug-in electric vehicle (BEV and PHEV) company and fourth largest BEV company in the world, with 9.1% and 7% global market share respectively in 2021. The company is undertaking rapid expansion, with sales hitting over 100,000 per month in March 2022, and is expecting to sell between 1.5 million to 2 million plug-in EVs in 2022, around 3 to 4 times the volume in 2021, possibly overtaking current world leader Tesla.

The company also has a battery division, which is the world's fourth largest producer of EV batteries with a market share of 8.8%.

SAIC Motor

SAIC Motor Corp., Ltd. (formerly Shanghai Automotive Industry Corporation) is a Chinese state-owned automobile manufacturer headquartered in Anting, Shanghai. Founded in 1955, it is currently the largest of the "Big Four" state-owned car manufacturers of China, namely: SAIC Motor, FAW Group, Dongfeng Motor Corporation, and Changan Automobile, with car sales of 5.37 million, 3.50 million, 3.28 million and 2.30 million in 2021 respectively.

The company produces and sells vehicles under its own branding, such as Maxus, MG, Roewe, Baojun (under SGMW), Wuling (under SGMW), Feifan, as well as under foreign-branded joint ventures such as SAIC-Volkswagen and SAIC-General Motors. In 2021, domestic-branded cars took 52% of sales. It also produces electric vehicles under some of the previously listed brandings, including dedicated EV brands such as Feifan.

It is currently a Fortune Global 100 company, ranked 60 on the list. Including SGMW, it is also the third largest plug-in electric vehicle (BEV and PHEV) company and second largest BEV company in the world, with 10.5% and 13% global market share respectively in 2021, selling under brand names such as Wuling, Baojun, Maxus, MG, Roewe and Feifan.

Great Wall Motor

Great Wall Motor Co., Ltd. (GWM) is a Chinese privately-owned automobile manufacturer headquartered in Baoding, Hebei. Founded in 1984, it is currently the eighth largest automobile manufacturer in China, with 1.281 million sales in 2021.

The company produces and sells vehicles under its own branding, such as GWM, Haval, WEY, TANK, POER, ORA. It also produces electric vehicles under some of the previously listed brandings, including dedicated EV brands such as ORA.

Named after the Great Wall of China, the company is China's largest producer of sport-utility vehicles (SUVs) and pick-up trucks. In 2021, it was the third largest Chinese plug-in electric vehicle manufacturer in the Chinese market, with 4% of market share, selling under brand names such as Ora and Haval.

GAC Group

Guangzhou Automobile Group Corp., Ltd. (GAC Group) is a Chinese state-owned automobile manufacturer headquartered in Guangzhou, Guangdong. Founded in 1954, it is currently the fifth largest automobile manufacturer in China, with 2.144 million sales in 2021.

The company produces and sells vehicles under its own branding, such as Trumpchi, Aion, Hycan as well as under foreign-branded joint ventures such as GAC-Toyota, GAC-Honda, GAC-FCA (Jeep) and GAC-Mitsubishi. It also produces electric vehicles under some of the previously listed brandings, including dedicated EV brands such as Aion and Hycan.

In 2021, it was the fourth largest Chinese plug-in electric vehicle manufacturer in the Chinese market, with 4% of market share. It sold over 20,000 units of EVs in March 2022.

Geely

Zhejiang Geely Holding Group Co., Ltd (ZGH), commonly known as Geely, is a Chinese multinational automotive company headquartered in Hangzhou, Zhejiang. The company is privately held by Chinese billionaire business magnate Li Shufu. It was established in 1986 and entered the automotive industry in 1997 with its Geely Auto subsidiary. Geely Auto is currently the seventh largest automobile manufacturer in China, with 1.328 million sales in 2021.

The company produces and sells vehicles under its own branding, such as Geely Auto, Geometry, Maple, Zeekr, under foreign-located subsidiaries, such as Volvo Cars, Polestar, Lynk & Co, Proton, Lotus as well as commercial only vehicles under the London EV Company, Ouling Auto and Yuan Cheng Auto (Farizon Auto) brands. It also produces electric vehicles under some of the previously listed brandings, including dedicated EV brands such as Geometry, Maple, Zeekr and Polestar.

The group sold over 2.2 million cars in 2021. The company sold over 17,926 plug-in electric vehicles in January 2022.

Other companies
Chery
Changan Automobile
Nio
XPeng
Li Auto
Neta (Hozon Auto)
Leapmotor
AITO
Wuling Hongguang Mini EV

Battery manufacturers
The battery industry is closely related to the EV industry as batteries constitute around 1/3 of the cost of EVs and around 80% of lithium-ion batteries in the world are used in EVs. It is estimated to be worth around $30 billion 2021 and expected to grow to around $127 billion by 2027, with demand expected to reach 3000 Gwh by 2030. Globally, manufacturing capacity is expected to increase to more than 5,500 GWh by 2030, including 3,000 GWh of capacity announced by Chinese manufacturers to date.

As of 2021, total demand of the market was 296.8 GWh, over double of the amount in 2020. As of Q1 2021, LFP type battery market share reached 24.1%, with Chinese manufacturers holding a near monopoly, and is expected to rise further to surpass NCM type batteries in 2028.

Domestic companies

CATL

Contemporary Amperex Technology Co, (CATL) is a Chinese battery manufacturer and technology company founded in 2011 that specializes in the manufacturing of lithium-ion batteries for electric vehicles and energy storage systems, as well as battery management systems (BMS). With a market share of 32.6% in 2021, CATL is the biggest lithium-ion battery manufacturer for EVs in the world, producing 96.7 GWh of the global 296.8 GWh, up 167.5% year on year. The company has a manufacturing capacity target of >500 GWh by 2025 and >800 GWh by 2030.

Other companies
Companies listed include all battery manufacturers, some of which may not be involved in EV battery manufacturing.
BYD
26.3 GWh (up 167.7%) and 8.8% share. Manufacturing capacity target of 670 Gwh by 2025
CALB
7.9 GWh (up 130.5%) and 2.7% share. Manufacturing capacity target of 500 Gwh by 2025 and 1000 Gwh by 2030.
Gotion
6.4 GWh (up 161.3%) and 2.1% share. Manufacturing capacity target of 300 Gwh by 2025. Around 26% owned by Volkswagen.
SVOLT
3.1 GWh (up 430.8%) and 1.0% share. Manufacturing capacity target of 600 Gwh by 2025. Spun off from battery unit of Great Wall Motor.
EVE Energy
Manufacturing capacity target of 200 Gwh by 2025.
Tianjin Lishen
Manufacturing capacity target of >100 Gwh by 2025.
Farasis Energy
Manufacturing capacity target of >100 Gwh by 2025. Backed by Mercedes-Benz.
ChinaREPT
Manufacturing capacity target of 200 Gwh by 2025.

Battery companies by EV battery market share

Other developments

Energy storage 

E-vehicles use only electric motors and gearboxes, and have few parts requiring maintenance. Compared to traditional vehicles and excluding the battery, they are cheaper and easier to build.  However, building battery with sufficient capacity and discharge-cycles is a challenge.

BYD Company is a Chinese company that builds rechargeable batteries using a new technology that, according to the company, makes them safer than other lithium-ion models. In 2005, it became the world's leading small battery company and is one of the world's largest manufacturers of rechargeable batteries. It is emerging as a leader in the technology sector.

Tianjin Lishen Battery Joint-Stock Co. Ltd. is another China based battery manufacturer. The company has a partnership with Coda Automotive, a California based company, to develop a Coda electric vehicle and ultimately, batteries for use in electricity generation. The focus of the latter will be to provide energy storage for wind and solar energy generation.

In 2017, the government battery subsidies fell by 30% and Chinese EV sales dropped.

Energy infrastructure 

While the shape of this industry is still emerging, electricity generation and the infrastructure to deliver energy appear to be the areas with the highest potential and relevancy to manage future energy use. According to consulting group Oliver Wyman, "some utilities are already engaging a specific area of the value chain, setting priorities for near-term, medium-term, and long-term initiatives. They have begun to model different market and business impact scenarios, with the goal of identifying the biggest upsides and pitfalls."

Utilities have begun to develop focused strategies in areas where they are well positioned to serve the electric-vehicle value chain. At the moment, a variety of business design ideas are competing to shape the new marketplace. China has invested a great deal into this fundamental component of the value chain, and some of the principal facilitators are as follows:
 State Grid Corporation of China
 Jiangxi Ganneng. Co
An electricity provider, year-end 2009, the Company finished approximately six billion kilowatt-hours of on-grid electricity, and had an attributable installed capacity of 1.5 million kilowatts, including 1.4 million kilowatts of thermal power and 100,000 kilowatts of hydropower.
 Nari Technology Development
The Company develops, manufactures and sells software and hardware products serving the power industry, and also provide system integration services. It also provides software and hardware services and system integration services for things such as power grid dispatching automation products, electricity market commercial operating systems, and electrical control automation products.
XJ Electric Co.
This company is primarily engaged in research, development, manufacture and distribution of automation, protection and controlling products for electric power systems. Specifically, it provides power grid and power generation equipment, transformers, electrical systems, power distribution network products, electrified railway products and direct current (DC) power distribution systems.

Encouraging policy 
China has promoted the development of the electric vehicle (EV) industry through a series of encouraging policy measures to reduce petroleum fuel consumption and greenhouse gas emissions. Still, the market for electric cars is small. Against this backdrop, the Chinese government began phasing out EV subsidies in 2018 with the goal of completely eliminating them by 2022, which is undoubtedly a huge challenge for the EV market. In recent years, the Chinese government has introduced a series of incentive policy measures to promote the development of the electric vehicle industry, such as consumer subsidies, various tax exemptions, toll-free, charging infrastructure construction, research and development grants, etc. (R & D) electric vehicle manufacturers.

See also

Economy of China
 Automotive industry in China
 Climate change in China
 Electric Vehicle Company
 Electric vehicle conversion
 Electric vehicles in Pakistan
 Electrification
 Hybrid electric vehicle
 List of production battery electric vehicles
 Motorized bicycle
 New energy vehicles in China
 Pollution in China
 Renewable energy in China
 Sustainable business
 Sustainable transport

External links
 List of all chinese electric car brands and price range.

References 

China